WFLO-FM is a Contemporary Christian-formatted broadcast radio station licensed to Farmville, Virginia, serving Southside Virginia.  WFLO-FM is owned and operated by Educational Media Foundation.

On January 2021, Educational Media Foundation agrees to buy Colonial Broadcasting Company’s WFLO and WFLO-FM. WFLO end its broadcast as full service on December 31. After the sale EMF convert both radio to K-Love and divest the AM station to Heart of Virginia Communications.

Former logos

References

External links
 WFLO 95.7FM Online
 

1961 establishments in Virginia
FLO-FM
Radio stations established in 1961